Ternopil Oblast (also referred to as Ternopilshchyna, or Ternopillia) is an oblast (province) of Ukraine. Its administrative center is Ternopil, through which flows the Seret, a tributary of the Dniester. Population: 

One of the natural wonders of the region are its cave complexes. Although Ternopil Oblast is among the smallest regions in Ukraine, over 100 caves have been discovered there. Scientists believe these are only 20% of all possible caves in the region. The biggest cave is Optymistychna Cave. Measuring  in total length, it is the longest cave in Eurasia and the fifth longest in the world (see list of longest caves). Twenty percent of the land in the region is chernozem soil.

Among its attractions, Ternopil Oblast has 34 castles.

Geography

It is situated at the western part of the Podilian Upland, which is known for its rocky terrain. Among noticeable mountains there are the Kremenets Mountains. The oblast is also famous for its caves.

One of the major rivers in the country Dniester forms southern and southwestern borders of Ternopil Oblast with the adjacent Chernivtsi Oblast and Ivano-Frankivsk Oblast. Its tributaries that flow through the oblast include Zbruch, Seret, and Strypa among just a few of them. The Seret River (not to be confused with Siret nor Seret) is a left tributary of the Dniester flowing through the oblast administrative center, i.e. Ternopil.

Ternopil Oblast is one of two oblasts in West Ukraine that do not have an international border. It is surrounded by five other oblasts of Ukraine: Chernivtsi Oblast – to the south, Ivano-Frankivsk Oblast – to the southwest, Lviv Oblast – to the northwest, Rivne Oblast – to the north, and Khmelnytskyi Oblast – to the east.

History

Historic administrative affiliation of the area:
1199-1434 Galicia-Volyn principality
1434-1569: Crown of the Polish Kingdom:  Ruthenian Voivodeship, Podolian Voivodeship  / Grand Duchy of Lithuania:  Ziemia wołyńska 
1566-1569: Crown of the Polish Kingdom:  Ruthenian voivodship, Podolskie voivodship  / Grand Duchy of Lithuania:  Volyn Voivodship 
1569-1672: Crown of the Kingdom of Poland,  Lesser Poland Province of the Polish Crown: Ruthenian voivodship, Volyn voivodship, Podolskie voivodship 
1672-1699: Crown of the Kingdom of Poland,  Małopolska province: Ruthenian voivodship, Volyn voivodship  / Ottoman Empire: Podolia Eyalet
1699-1772: Crown of the Kingdom of Poland,  Małopolska province: Ruthenian voivodship, Volyn voivodship, Podolskie voivodship 
1772-1795: Habsburg monarchy, Kingdom of Galicia and Lodomeria ( Austrian Partition ) / Crown of the Kingdom of Poland,  Lesser Poland Province: Volhynia Voivodship 
1795-1804: Habsburg Monarchy, Kingdom of Galicia and Lodomeria ( Austrian Partition ) / Russian Empire:  Volhynia Governorate  ( Russian Partition ')
1804-1867: Empire of Austria, Kingdom of Galicia and Lodomeria ( Austrian Partition ) / Russian Empire:  Volyn Governorate  ( Russian Partition )
1867 - November 1918: Austria-Hungary, Kingdom of Galicia and Lodomeria ( Austrian Partition ) / Russian Empire:  Volhynia Governorate  ( Russian Partition )
November 1918 - July 1919 - West Ukrainian People's Republic ( de facto )
1919  (1923)  -1945: Rzeczpospolita Polska:  Tarnopol Voivodeship, Volyn Voivodeship 
1944  (1945)  - 1991: USSR, Ukrainian SSR:  Ternopil region 
since 1991: Ukraine:  Ternopil region 

The oblast was created during the Second World War when both Nazi Germany and later the Soviet Union invaded Poland. Due to the Polish national policy in the area (Pacification action), many people favored the Soviet invasion of Eastern Galicia at first. However, soon thereafter, the Soviet security agencies started a witchhunt among nationally oriented members of Ukrainian resistance who emigrated to Poland after the Soviet-Ukrainian War as well as other reasons. Many people of local population regardless of their ethnic background were exiled to Siberia. On December 4, 1939, the voivodeship division in the West Ukraine was abolished and replaced with the existing Soviet administrative division oblast. Ternopil Oblast (originally Tarnopol Oblast) was established based mostly on the Tarnopol Voivodeship and southern portions of the Volhynian Voivodeship.

During the invasion of the Soviet Union by Nazi Germany, Ternopil became an object of fierce fighting between Soviet and German forces because of its importance as a rail transportation hub. During German occupation, the region (except for its Volhynian portion) became part of the District of Galicia and transferred to administration by the General Government. After the war, a destroyed residential section of Ternopil, near the river, was turned into an artificial lake rather than being rebuilt. Additionally, upon annexation to the Soviet Union's Ukrainian SSR, most ethnic Poles in the region were forcibly relocated to Poland, whose national borders had shifted far to the west. The area of the former Polish voivodeship was expanded by adding territory in the north, though the westernmost parts were transferred to the Lviv oblast. After 1945 Soviet authorities also encouraged ethnic Russians to settle in territories newly annexed to the Soviet Union, including the Ternopil oblast, though western Ukraine remained considerably less Russian than eastern Ukraine.

In Ukraine today, there are three provinces (oblasts) that formed the eastern part of the Kingdom of Galicia and Lodomeria. Two of these, Lviv Oblast and Ivano-Frankivsk Oblast were entirely contained in the kingdom; the third oblast of Ternopil was mainly in the kingdom apart from four of its most northerly counties (raions). These four counties, Kremenets Raion, Shumsk Raion, Lanivtsi as well as the northern half of Zbarazh Raion, were formerly part of the county of Krzemieniec in the Wolyn voivodeship (province) of the Second Polish Republic during the interwar period. Prior to World War I, they were part of Congress Poland. They never formed part of the Kingdom of Galicia. The remaining raions of Ternopil Oblast, listed below, were all part of the Kingdom of Galicia and mainly coterminous with the Kingdom's counties.

As Ukraine achieved independence in the 1990s, western Ukraine remained the heartland of Ukrainian political and cultural nationalism, and the political affiliations of Ternopil voters reflected that viewpoint. In the first elections after independence, the People's Movement of Ukraine was the leading party in the oblast. A majority of oblast voters supported the Ukrainian nationalist-oriented Electoral Bloc Yuliya Tymoshenko in the 2002 Ukrainian parliamentary election. Over 88% of voters supported Yulia Tymoshenko of the All-Ukrainian Union "Fatherland" in the 2010 Ukrainian presidential election.

By 2005, the population of the oblast had grown to roughly 225,000, consisting primarily of ethnic Ukrainians with a large Russian or Russian-speaking minority. The city of Ternopil has important institutions of higher education, including two teacher's colleges, an international medical school with instruction in English, and one of three economics institutes in Ukraine.

The religion of the majority is Ukrainian Greek Catholic, though there is a notable Orthodox presence and a small Protestant minority. Many churches which were closed or destroyed under Soviet rule have rebuilt since independence. The local Jewish community, which was very large before 1939, disappeared in the Holocaust and was not reestablished after 1945. There are no active synagogues in the oblast and only a few isolated individuals affiliating with the Jewish faith.

Points of interest

The oblast is known for its castles and fortresses. Due to the underfunding of the state program for the preservation of cultural heritage, many of objects of historical significance are in poor condition.
The following historic-cultural sites were nominated for the Seven Wonders of Ukraine.
Verteba cave, a cave in Borshchiv Raion
Bohyt, a hill near Zbruch River where was found the Zbruch idol (Husiatyn Raion)
Buchach Ratusha, a former town hall in Buchach
Pochaiv Lavra, located in the city of Pochaiv, one of the biggest holy places of Christian Orthodox in Ukraine 
Zarvanytsia Spiritual Center, a big holy place of Greek Catholics of Podillia (Terebovlia Raion)
Vyshnivets Palace, a princely palace in Vyshnivets (Zbarazh Raion)
Camp UPA, a museum of Ukrainian resistance movement in Shumsk Raion
Dzhuryn Waterfall
Castles of Ternopil Region (Ternopil Castle, Berezhany Castle, Zbarazh Castle, and others)

Population

National composition
The population is predominantly Ukrainophone and about 98% consider themselves Ukrainians. Among the biggest minorities are Poles and Russians who combine 1.6% of the total population. Most of the population is bilingual and the Ukrainian language is accepted in daily communications. The estimated population is 

In historical comparison, before World War II national composition was very different and according to the 1931 Polish Census Ukrainians were a slight majority in the Tarnopol Voivodeship at 54.8%, while there was almost no Russians. On the other hand, the Polish and Jewish population decreased drastically from 36.6% and 8.4% respectively.

Age structure
 0-14 years: 15.7%  (male 86,309/female 81,940)
 15-64 years: 69.0%  (male 360,305/female 381,271)
 65 years and over: 15.3%  (male 53,364/female 110,887) (2013 official)

Median age
 total: 38.6 years 
 male: 35.8 years 
 female:'' 41.4 years  (2013 official)

Economy and transportation

The economy is predominantly agriculturally oriented. Among industries, there is a well developed food industry particularly sugar production, alcohol, and dairy (such as butter). There is also number of factories such as "Vatra" (lighting equipment), Ternopil Harvester Plant, "Orion" (radio communication) among a few.

Ternopil Oblast has an adequate network of highways, while the city of Ternopil is located at the intersection of main European corridors along the E50 and E85 highways. There is a small airport in Ternopil (Ternopil Airport) which however mostly is used for charter flights. There is a well developed railroad network which is a part of the Lviv Railways. Water transportation is very limited and mostly along the Dniester River.

Subdivisions

After 18 July 2020

Before 18 July 2020
Before the 2020 administrative reform, Ternopil Oblast was administratively subdivided into 17 raions (districts), as well as 1 city (municipality) which is directly subordinate to the oblast government: Ternopil, the administrative center of the oblast. The average population number was around 50.6 thousands which is just below the national average.

Notable people
In town of Buchach was born a Nobel Prize recipient, writer Shmuel Yosef Agnon. The prize was given for works about fate of Galician Jews. Agnon worked for a Lviv newspaper, but after refusal to serve in the army he moved to Mandatory Palestine. In Ukraine he published over 70 of his early works.
Mike Mazurki, American professional athlete and actor 196 cm (6 ft 5 in) in height
Lee Strasberg, American theatre director and actor

See also

Subdivisions of Ukraine
List of Canadian place names of Ukrainian origin

Notes

References

External links

Ternopil Council website

 
Oblasts of Ukraine
States and territories established in 1939
1939 establishments in Ukraine